The Bewer is a river of Lower Saxony, Germany. It is a left, northern tributary of the River Ilme. It flows solely through the municipal territory of the borough of Dassel.

Course 
The Bewer rises in the middle of the Elfas hills and is their most important drainage system. Passing through hills covered in mixed forest, the stream bed soon leaves this small ridge and runs initially in a southeasterly direction along its southern perimeter. The stream then passes Deitersen and finally empties into the Ilme near  (a district of Dassel).

Flora and fauna
Endangered species in and on the Bewer include the noble crayfish and the marsh marigold. For the protection of this ecosystem, a renaturalisation has been carried out.

See also
List of rivers of Lower Saxony

References

External links 
 Modellvorhaben Bewer
 Bewer waterbody fact file (pdf file; 789 kB)

Rivers of Lower Saxony
Rivers of Germany